Patrick Mattioni (born 18 October 1966) is a French gymnast. He competed in eight events at the 1988 Summer Olympics.

References

External links
 

1966 births
Living people
French male artistic gymnasts
Olympic gymnasts of France
Gymnasts at the 1988 Summer Olympics
Gymnasts from Paris
20th-century French people